Mtsensk is a town in Oryol Oblast, Russia, located on the Zusha River (a tributary of the Oka)  northeast of Oryol, the administrative center of the oblast. Population:    28,000 (1970).

History

It was first mentioned in the Nikon Chronicle in 1146 as a part of the Principality of Chernigov. The name comes from the Mtsena River, a tributary of the Zusha, beside which the fortress stood. In 1238, Mtsensk was destroyed by Batu Khan. Since 1320, it was under the rule of Lithuania, eventually becoming a part of the Muscovy in 1505. Since the beginning of the 19th century, Mtsensk was rapidly developing as an industrial town.

During Operation Barbarossa, German armoured forces captured the town in the fall of 1941. In particular, troops of the 3rd Panzer Division, 4th Panzer Division, and Infantry Regiment Großdeutschland saw combat in the immediate vicinity. During the Battle of Kursk in 1943, Mtsensk served as the primary war zone. On 20 July 1943, Mtsensk was liberated by Soviet troops of the Bryansk Front.

Administrative and municipal status
Within the framework of administrative divisions, Mtsensk serves as the administrative center of Mtsensky District, even though it is not a part of it. As an administrative division, it is incorporated separately as the town of oblast significance of Mtsensk—an administrative unit with the status equal to that of the districts. As a municipal division, the town of oblast significance of Mtsensk is incorporated as Mtsensk Urban Okrug.

Twin towns – sister cities

Mtsensk is twinned with:
 Kubrat, Bulgaria

See also
Lady Macbeth of the Mtsensk District (disambiguation)

References

Notes

Sources

Cities and towns in Oryol Oblast
Mtsensky Uyezd